Mrigendra Nath Maiti (Bengali: মৃগেন্দ্রনাথ মাইতি) (died 7 December 2020) was an Indian (West Bengal State) politician and Member of Legislative Assembly (M.L.A.). He was elected as an All India Trinamool Congress candidate from Medinipur (Vidhan Sabha constituency)  in the  2011 Assembly Election.

In the Assembly Election of 2016, he was re elected as All India Trinamool Congress Candidate from Medinipur (Vidhan Sabha constituency).

He was also the Chairman of Midnapore Kharagpur Development Authority (M.K.D.A.) and State General Secretary of Paschim Bangya Rajya Sarkari Karmachari Federation (Unified).

In Assembly Election of 2016

In Assembly Election of 2011

Personal life 
 S/o : Late Kedarnath  Maiti
 He completed M.A. from Rabindra Bharati University in 1971 
 He was a Retd. Employee, Govt. of West Bengal

See also 
 Mamata Banerjee
 All India Trinamool Congress
 Suvendu Adhikari

References 

http://www.wbdma.gov.in/HTM/MUNI_MKDA.htm
http://myneta.info/westbengal2011/candidate.php?candidate_id=1211
http://www.wbassembly.gov.in/pdf/memberlist_15.pdf
http://www.hindustanpages.com/people/government-directory/shri-mrigendra-nath-maiti-mla-medinipur-west-bengal/
http://www.ceowestbengal.nic.in/affidavits_2006/218/MrigendraNathMaity/Mrigendra_Nath_Maity.htm

External links 
 http://aitcofficial.org/
 https://www.paschimmedinipur.gov.in/mkda/
 http://www.wbdma.gov.in/HTM/MUNI_MKDA.htm
 http://www.wburbandev.gov.in/html/bs89_mkda.html
 http://www.midnapore.in/district-info/paschim-medinipur-administrative-setup.html

2020 deaths
Indian civil servants
Trinamool Congress politicians from West Bengal
Rabindra Bharati University alumni
Year of birth missing